Schiedea kaalae, known as Oahu schiedea or Maolioli in Hawaiian, is a species of flowering plant in the family Caryophyllaceae, that is endemic to the island of Oahu in Hawaii. It is threatened by habitat loss.

References

kaalae
Endemic flora of Hawaii
Critically endangered plants
Taxonomy articles created by Polbot